Jerri may refer to:

 Jerri (given name), a feminine given name
 Abdul Jerri (born 1932), Iraqi-American physicist
 Jèrri, the name of island Jersey in the local language Jèrriais
 Jerri (footballer) (born 1982), Jerri Ariel Farias Hahn, Brazilian footballer

See also
 Jarri
 Jerrie
 Gerri (disambiguation)
 Jerry (disambiguation)